The 2019 season was the Los Angeles Chargers' 50th in the National Football League (NFL), their 60th overall, their fourth in the Greater Los Angeles Area and their third under head coach Anthony Lynn. It also marked the Chargers' third and final season playing their home games at Dignity Health Sports Park, as the team moved into SoFi Stadium in Inglewood beginning with the 2020 season alongside the Los Angeles Rams. With a 2–5 record after Week 7, the Chargers failed to match or improve on their 12–4 record from 2018. Despite winning on the road against the Jacksonville Jaguars in Week 14, the Chargers were mathematically eliminated from playoff contention the same week as a result of the Pittsburgh Steelers beating the Arizona Cardinals 23–17. After a Week 15 loss to the Minnesota Vikings, the Chargers suffered their first losing season since 2016, and their first as a Los Angeles-based team. Also, for the first time since 2015, the Chargers were swept by their division. The Chargers also suffered the most one-score losses by an NFL team during the season, with nine.

This was also the final season with longtime quarterback Philip Rivers, as he signed with the Indianapolis Colts in the offseason.

Uniform change
On April 16, the Chargers announced that the powder blue jerseys that served as the alternate colored jersey would become the primary home colored jerseys, replacing the navy blue jerseys that served as the primary home colored jersey since the team's 2007 uniform overhaul. On September 2, the Chargers announced their uniform schedule for the 2019 season. In addition to this uniform switch, the Chargers silently ditched their navy blue facemask for gold. However, the navy blue facemask was still used in games where the Chargers wore navy blue jerseys.

Draft

Roster changes

Free agents

Staff

Final roster

Preseason

Regular season
The Chargers' regular season schedule was released on April 19.

Schedule

Note: Intra-division opponents are in bold text.

Game summaries

Week 1: vs. Indianapolis Colts

The Chargers won their first home opener since 2015, when they were based in San Diego. They also started 1–0 for the first time since 2015. The Chargers open their third and final season at Dignity Health Sports Park, as they will move into SoFi Stadium in Inglewood in 2020.

Week 2: at Detroit Lions

Week 3: vs. Houston Texans

Week 4: at Miami Dolphins

This was the Chargers' first win in Miami since the 1982 Epic in Miami game.

Week 5: vs. Denver Broncos

Week 6: vs. Pittsburgh Steelers

Week 7: at Tennessee Titans

Week 8: at Chicago Bears

Week 9: vs. Green Bay Packers

Week 10: at Oakland Raiders

Week 11: vs. Kansas City Chiefs
NFL International Series

Week 13: at Denver Broncos

Week 14: at Jacksonville Jaguars

Week 15: vs. Minnesota Vikings

Week 16: vs. Oakland Raiders

This was Chargers final home game at Dignity Health Sports Park before moving into their new stadium in the 2020 season. This was also the last time they faced the Oakland Raiders—home or away—prior to the Raiders relocation to Las Vegas in 2020.

Week 17: at Kansas City Chiefs

Standings

Division

Conference

References

External links

Los Angeles
Los Angeles Chargers seasons
Los Angeles Chargers
Chargers